Girdharpura Shahpura is a village, situated in the erstwhile province of Shekhawati of Rajasthan, India. It is located in the district of Jhunjhunu, approximately 22.2 km from Nawalgarh.

References

External links

Shekhawati
Villages in Jhunjhunu district